Isocline Hill is a hill in the southern part of the Augen Bluffs, in the Miller Range, Antarctica. It was so named by the Ohio State University Geological Party, 1967–68, because an isoclinal fold is well exposed on the side of the hill.

References

Hills of Oates Land